Siege of Santo Domingo may refer to:

 Siege of Santo Domingo (1655)
 Siege of Santo Domingo (1805)
 Siege of Santo Domingo (1808)